Tasmantrix tasmaniensis is a moth of the family Micropterigidae. It is known from in wet forests of western Tasmania.

The forewing length is 3.7 mm for males. The forewing ground colour is rich brown with strong coppery-bronze iridescence. The basal costal streak is absent but there are four primary shining white fasciae and two secondary patches. The first is a large oblique costal blotch at mid-length, separated from a smaller blotch on the termen in the same position. The second consists of two similar blotches at three quarters on the costa and the termen, but with rows of black scales along the veins. Finally, a small, indistinct streak of paler scales about halfway along the cubital sulcis and a few pale scales in the apex of the wing. The fringes are grey-brown with white tips but wholly white adjacent to the fasciae. The hindwing is dark grey scaled with bronzy lustre.

Etymology
The species name is derived from its geographic location in Tasmania.

References

Micropterigidae
Moths described in 2010